Kushkak (also Romanized as Kūshkak; also known as Gūshkalak and Kūsgak) is a village in Mazraeh Now Rural District, in the Central District of Ashtian County, Markazi Province, Iran. At the 2006 census, its population was 43, in 18 families.

References 

Populated places in Ashtian County